Espelho Mágico (The Magic Mirror) is a Brazilian telenovela produced and broadcast by Rede Globo. It premiered on 14 June 1977 and ended on 5 December 1977, with a total of 150 episodes. It's the nineteenth "novela das oito" to be aired on the timeslot. It is created and written by Lauro César Muniz and directed by Daniel Filho, Gonzaga Blota and Marco Aurélio Bagno.

Cast 
 Juca de Oliveira - Jordão Amaral (author of Coquetel de Amor) (meaning Cocktail of Love)
 Tarcísio Meira - Diogo Maia (Ciro in Coquetel de Amor)
 Glória Menezes - Leila Lombardi (Rosana in Coquetel de Amor)
 Mauro Mendonça - Nelson Novaes
 Sônia Braga - Cínthia Levy (Camila in Coquetel de Amor)
 Tony Ramos - Paulo Morel (Cristiano in Coquetel de Amor)
 Vera Fischer - Diana Queiroz (Débora in Coquetel de Amor)
 Carlos Eduardo Dolabella - Edgar Rabello
 Milton Moraes - Vicente Drummond
 Pepita Rodrigues - Bruna Maria Novaes (Kátia in Coquetel de Amor)
 Lídia Brondi - Beatriz Lombardi Amaral
 Jorge Cherques - Alfredo Barbosa
 Kito Junqueira - Nestor Rey
 Heloísa Millet - Luiza Barbosa
 Djenane Machado - Lenita (Neide in Coquetel de Amor)
 Jorge Botelho - Jorge Maya (Eduardo in Coquetel de Amor)
 Maria Lúcia Dahl - Lúcia Mendes (Paula in Coquetel de Amor)
 Nélson Caruso - Newton Viana (Roberto in Coquetel de Amor)
 Yara Amaral - Suzete Calmon (Ernestina in Coquetel de Amor)
 Daniel Filho - João Gabriel (director in Coquetel de Amor)
 Lima Duarte - Carijó
 Yoná Magalhães - Nora Pellegrine (Assunta in Coquetel de Amor)
 Sérgio Britto - Gastão Cortez (Benito in Coquetel de Amor)

References 

1977 Brazilian television series debuts
TV Globo telenovelas
1977 Brazilian television series endings
1977 telenovelas
Brazilian telenovelas
Portuguese-language telenovelas
Television series about television